The 1973–74 Eredivisie season was the 14th season of the Eredivisie, the top level of ice hockey in the Netherlands. Six teams participated in the league, and the Tilburg Trappers won the championship. H.H.IJ.C. Den Haag finished first, but the title was awarded To Tilburg, as Den Haag used an ineligible player.

Regular season

External links
Nederlandse IJshockey Bond

Neth
Eredivisie (ice hockey) seasons